Caryomyia tubicola, the hickory bullet gall midge, is a species of gall midge in the family Cecidomyiidae.

References

Further reading

 
 

Cecidomyiinae
Articles created by Qbugbot
Insects described in 1862
Gall-inducing insects